The Glasgow Unity Theatre was a theatre group that was formed in 1941, in Glasgow. The Unity theatre movement developed from workers' drama groups in the 1930s, seeing itself as using theatre to highlight the issues of the working class being produced by and for working-class audiences. The movement had strong links with the Communist Party of Great Britain and the Left Book Club Theatre Guild.

The theatre in Glasgow was formed as an amalgamation of the Workers' Theatre Group, the Clarion Players, the Transport Players and the Glasgow Jewish Institute players. The company toured in a converted truck, performing in halls and theatres.

In the Summer of 1946, the company presented Robert McLeish's The Gorbals Story at the Queen's Theatre, Gallowgate. During the next three years, it achieved unparalleled critical and popular success. It was performed over six hundred times in towns and villages in Scotland and England. It was seen by over one hundred thousand people in the first six months alone. The high point of its success came with its appearance at the Garrick Theatre in London in 1948. The Gorbals Story was not only successful financially but it was also a highly important play, which strongly influenced the development of Scottish theatre. Although only an amateur production, it was later made into a film and released by New World Pictures in 1950.

The company was also instrumental in the creation of the Edinburgh Festival Fringe, which would become the world's largest arts festival. They were one of eight companies who performed, uninvited, in Edinburgh in August 1947, alongside the newly established Edinburgh International Festival. These unofficial performances are now commonly accepted as the first Edinburgh Festival Fringe, although it wasn't referred to by that name until several years later.

The shows the company performed in that first year were The Lower Depths by Maxim Gorky and The Laird O’ Torwatletie by Robert MacLellan, both at The Pleasance Little Theatre. The following year, they performed another MacLellan play - The Flooers o' Edinburgh, this time in Princes Street Gardens, as a way of reaching more people.

Given the company's political leanings, it is likely their presence in Edinburgh had a political or protest motivation. It is suggested they viewed the official festival as bourgeois and removed from the mass public, something they aimed to rectify through their performances.

Despite these successes, the company folded in 1951 with financial problems arising from an attempt to turn fully professional.

Productions
Maxim Gorky The Lower Depths
Ena Lamont Stewart Men Should Weep
Robert MacLellan The Flooers o' Edinburgh
Robert MacLellan The Laird O’ Torwatletie
Roddy McMillan All in Good Faith
Robert McLeish The Gorbals Story
George Munro Gold in his Boots
Benedick Scott The Lambs of God

References

Bibliography

Theatre in Scotland
1941 establishments in Scotland
1951 disestablishments in Scotland
Culture in Glasgow
Theatre companies at Edinburgh Festival Fringe